Lufkin is a brand featuring primarily measurement tools such as calipers, gauges, micrometers, and measuring tapes. Lufkin is a brand of Apex Tool Group.

History

The company was founded by Edward Taylor Lufkin, an American Civil War veteran of the Sixtieth Regiment Ohio Volunteer Infantry in Cleveland, Ohio 1869 and was originally named E.T. Lufkin Board and Log Rule Manufacturing Company.  Its Canada-based plant was in Barrie, Ontario.

The company was acquired in 1967 by Cooper Industries.

Innovations

Throughout its history Lufkin patented a variety of devices and manufacturing processes.

Gallery

References

External links

 
The Lufkin Rule Company Origins, a genealogy page about Edward Taylor Lufkin at the Internet Archive

Cooper Tools brands
Dimensional instruments
Manufacturing companies based in Texas
Tool manufacturing companies of the United States
Companies established in 1869
1869 establishments in Ohio